The 2018 Oracle Challenger Series – Houston was a professional tennis tournament played on outdoor hard courts. This tournament was part of the 2018 ATP Challenger Tour and the 2018 WTA 125K series. The first edition took place at the George R. Brown Tennis Center from November 12 to 18, 2018 in Houston, United States.

Men's singles main-draw entrants

Seeds

 1 Rankings are as of 5 November 2018.

Other entrants
The following players received wildcards into the singles main draw:
  Tom Fawcett
  Sumit Sarkar
  Ronnie Schneider
  Roy Smith

The following players received entry from the qualifying draw:
  Harrison Adams
  Alexis Galarneau
  Julian Lenz
  Michael Redlicki

Women's singles main-draw entrants

Seeds

 1 Rankings are as of 5 November 2018.

Other entrants
The following players received wildcards into the singles main draw:
  Belinda Bencic
  Kayla Day
  Michaela Haet
  Peng Shuai
  Bianca Turati

The following players received entry from the qualifying draw:
  Lauren Davis
  Elizabeth Halbauer
  Dalma Gálfi 
  Kristína Kučová
  Ann Li
  Whitney Osuigwe

The following players received entry into the main draw as lucky losers:
  Jacqueline Cako
  Louisa Chirico
  Réka Luca Jani
  Katherine Sebov

Withdrawals
  Kristie Ahn → replaced by  Beatriz Haddad Maia
  Eugenie Bouchard → replaced by  Jacqueline Cako
  Verónica Cepede Royg → replaced by  Deniz Khazaniuk
  Kayla Day → replaced by  Réka Luca Jani
  Julia Glushko → replaced by  Naomi Broady
  Claire Liu → replaced by  Louisa Chirico
  Christina McHale → replaced by  Deborah Chiesa
  Monica Niculescu → replaced by  Katherine Sebov

Retirements
  Dalma Gálfi (back injury)

Women's doubles main-draw entrants

Seeds 

 Rankings are as of 5 November 2018

Other entrants 
The following pair received a wildcard into the doubles main draw:
  Anna Bowtell /  Victoria Smirnova

Champions

Men's singles

 Bradley Klahn def.  Roy Smith 7–6(7–4), 7–6(7–4).

Women's singles

  Peng Shuai def.  Lauren Davis 1–6, 7–5, 6–4

Men's doubles

 Austin Krajicek /  Nicholas Monroe def.  Marcelo Arévalo /  James Cerretani 4–6, 7–6(7–3), [10–5].

Women's doubles

  Maegan Manasse /  Jessica Pegula def.  Desirae Krawczyk /  Giuliana Olmos, 1–6, 6–4, [10–8]

References

External links 
 Official website

2018
2018 ATP Challenger Tour
2018 WTA 125K series
2018 in American sports